Sarteshniz (also Romanized as Sarteshnīz and Sar-e Teshnīz; also known as Sar-i-Tīshnīz) is a village in Kiar-e Sharqi Rural District, in the Central District of Kiar County, Chaharmahal and Bakhtiari Province, Iran. At the 2006 census, its population was 2,959, in 634 families. The village is populated by Lurs.

References 

Populated places in Kiar County
Luri settlements in Chaharmahal and Bakhtiari Province